The Public Prosecution Service (OM) is the body of public prosecutors in the Dutch criminal justice system.

The literal translation of Openbaar Ministerie, "Public Ministry", can lead to a misunderstanding, as the OM is not a ministry like the Ministry of Finance.

The Public Prosecution Service decides who has to appear in front of the judge and for which offence or crime. It is the body that can decide to prosecute someone. The main domain of the OM is criminal law rather than civil law.

The OM has ten regional offices, directed nationally by the College van Procureurs-Generaal in The Hague. The OM is ultimately responsible to the Minister of Justice and Safety (Minister van Justitie en Veiligheid), who together with the college determines the priorities and organisation of the Service.

References

Law enforcement agencies of the Netherlands